Mande may refer to:

 Mandé peoples of western Africa
 Mande languages
 Manding, a term covering a subgroup of Mande peoples, and sometimes used for one of them, Mandinka
 Garo people of northeastern India and northern Bangladesh
 Mande River in Bosnia and Herzegovina
 Mandé, Mali

Surname
 Hendrik Mande (d. 1431), Dutch mystical writer
 Jerold Mande (b. 1954), American nutritionist and civil servant

See also
Mand (disambiguation)
Manda (disambiguation)
Mandi (disambiguation)

Language and nationality disambiguation pages